Nadorite is a mineral with the chemical formula PbSbO2Cl. It crystallizes in the orthorhombic crystal system and is brown, brownish-yellow or yellow in color, with a white or yellowish-white streak.

Nadorite is named after Djebel Nador in Algeria, where it was first identified in 1870.

Geologic occurrence
Djebel Nador and Djebel Debbar (both in the Constantine Province of Algeria) are its co-type localities. Also found as an alteration product of jamesonite in Cornwall, England.

References

Bibliography
Palache, P.; Berman H.; Frondel, C. (1960). "Dana's System of Mineralogy, Volume II: Halides, Nitrates, Borates, Carbonates, Sulfates, Phosphates, Arsenates, Tungstates, Molybdates, Etc. (Seventh Edition)" John Wiley and Sons, Inc., New York, pp. 1039-1041.

Halide minerals
Lead minerals
Antimonate minerals
Orthorhombic minerals
Minerals in space group 63